Chelghoum Laïd District is a district of Mila Province, Algeria.

The district is further divided into 3 municipalities:
Aïn Mellouk
Oued Athmania
Chelghoum Laïd

Districts of Mila Province